Appiano may refer to:

Appiano Gentile, a municipality in the province of Como, Italy
Appiano sulla strada del vino, Italian name for Eppan an der Weinstraße, a municipality in South Tyrol, Italy
Appiano (family), noble family that governed the principality of Piombino from the 14th to 18th centuries

See also
Appian, Ancient Roman philosopher